Tyra Turner (née Harper, born July 21, 1976) is a professional beach volleyball player from the United States who plays on the AVP Tour.

Turner is a graduate of the University of Central Florida, where she played volleyball all four years. In 1998, she was named UCF's Scholar Athlete of the Year and Female Athlete of the Year. Turner was inducted into the UCF Athletic Hall of Fame in 2004.

Turner has been married to fellow AVP pro Chad Turner since January 2005. They have three sons - Myles, Blake, and Preston - and live in Fort Myers, Florida.

References

External links
 Q & A with the AVP's Tyra Turner
 
 

1976 births
Living people
American women's volleyball players
American women's beach volleyball players
University of Central Florida alumni
21st-century American women
UCF Knights women's volleyball players